Beet western yellows virus (BWYV) is a plant pathogenic virus of the family Solemoviridae.

External links
ICTVdB - The Universal Virus Database: Beet western yellows virus
Family Groups - The Baltimore Method

Viral plant pathogens and diseases